Václav Jehlička (born on 24 March 1948 in Domažlice) is a Czech politician. In 1996 he was elected a member of the Senate and from January 2007 to May 2009 he was Minister of Culture.

He worked as a teacher until 1990. Then he served two full terms as Mayor of Telč from 1990 to 1998 and a half term from 2001 to 2002.

Jehlička is a graduate of the University of South Bohemia. He's married and has five children.

External links 
 Homepage
  Official biography

1948 births
Living people
Culture ministers of the Czech Republic
Members of the Senate of the Czech Republic
Mayors of places in the Czech Republic
TOP 09 politicians
KDU-ČSL Senators
University of South Bohemia alumni
People from Domažlice